Abbeydorney is a village in County Kerry, Ireland. Abbeydorney falls within the civil parish of O'Dorney.

History

Abbey 

The name of the village derives from the translation of the Irish Mainistir Ó dTorna - in English O'Dorney Abbey - which was the Cistercian Order Abbeydorney Abbey, established in 1154 and located north of the village. The abbey is often called Kyrie Eleison (which is Greek for Lord, have mercy). It was suppressed in 1537 during the reign of King Henry VIII of England.

Village

The village that developed around the abbey is of an agrarian nature and the institutions that have developed reflect this. In 1885, Abbeydorney GAA club was established, and in 1895 Abbeydorney Co-operative Dairy Society was formed. In 1920, during the War of Independence, the village creamery and a number of houses were burned to the ground by RIC Auxiliaries and Black and Tans in a reprisal attack.

Transport
Abbeydorney railway station serving the village opened on 20 December 1880 on the line from Tralee to Limerick via Listowel. Passenger services were withdrawn on 4 February 1963, although the route through Abbeydorney continued to be used by freight trains for a while before the line to Listowel was finally closed altogether in 1977 and then to Tralee 1978. The station closed on 6 February 1978.

Sport
The local Abbeydorney hurling team have won four County Championships, the last in 1974, and in more recent times their minor teams have won the minor county championship in 1999 and again in 2008.

The Abbeydorney Ladies Football Club was the feeding ground for the great Kerry Ladies teams of the 1980s and 1990s. In more recent years they secured back-to-back All-Irelands. They won the Junior All-Ireland Club title in 2004 and followed that a year later in 2005 by winning the All-Ireland Intermediate Club title.

Common surnames
According to Irish census of 1901 and 1911, common names in the area at the time included: Sullivan, Connor, Stack, Walsh, Shanahan, Buckley, Fitzgerald, Lawlor, Dowling, Glavin, McCarthy, Slattery, Brosnan, Hayes, Lynch, Moriarty, O'Connor, O'Leary, Lovett, Mahony, Maunsell, Murphy, Brennan, Cronin, Nolan, Sheehan, and Sheehy.

Notable people
 Amelia Wilmot, member of Cumann na mBan and spy during the Irish War of Independence.

See also
 List of towns and villages in Ireland

References

Towns and villages in County Kerry